Marinaccio is an Italian surname. Notable people with the surname include:

Ashley Marinaccio (born 1985), American theatre director, playwright, and performer
Dave Marinaccio (born 1952), American advertising executive and author
Ron Marinaccio (born 1995), American baseball player

Italian-language surnames